Niccolò Figari (born 24 January 1988) is an Italian water polo player. He competed in the 2020 Summer Olympics.

References

1988 births
Living people
Water polo players from Genoa
Water polo players at the 2020 Summer Olympics
Italian male water polo players
Olympic water polo players of Italy
21st-century Italian people